Agnes of Sully (French: Agnès) was a French noblewoman and Lady of Sully.
Agnesʻ parents were Lord Gilles II of Sully and Edelburge of Bourges, whilst Agnesʻ husband was William, Count of Sully.

Children of Agnes and William:
Eudes Archambaud
Ranier (Rodolphus), Prior of La Charité-sur-Loire, Abbot of Cluny
Henry of Sully (died 1189)
Margaret (Marguerite)
Elizabeth of Sully, Abbess of Sainte-Trinité

References

House of Sully
Lords of Sully
 House of Blois